The 2016 French Super Series was the tenth Superseries tournament of the 2016 BWF Super Series. The tournament took place in Paris, France on 25 to 30 October 2016.

Men's singles

Seeds

Top half

Bottom half

Finals

Women's singles

Seeds

Top half

Bottom half

Finals

Men's doubles

Seeds

Top half

Bottom half

Finals

Women's doubles

Seeds

Top half

Bottom half

Finals

Mixed doubles

Seeds

Top half

Bottom half

Finals

References

External links
 French Open at www.yonexifb.com/en/
 BWF World Superseries at www.bwfworldsuperseries.com

2016 Super Series
2016 BWF Super Series
Super Series
International sports competitions hosted by Paris
October 2016 sports events in France